Phaffomyces is a genus of fungi within the Saccharomycetales order. It is placed within the Pichiaceae fungi family.

The genus name of Phaffomyces is in honour of Herman Jan Phaff (1913–2001), who was a scientist who specialised in the ecology of yeast.

The genus was circumscribed by Yuzo Yamada in Bull. Fac. Agric. Shizuoka Univ. vol.47 on page 30 in 1997.

Species
As accepted by GBIF;
 Phaffomyces antillensis 
 Phaffomyces opuntiae 
 Phaffomyces thermotolerans 
 Phaffomyces usticensis

References

External links
Phaffomyces at Index Fungorum

Saccharomycetes